Mid-Plains Community College (MPCC) is a public community college in southwest Nebraska with seven campuses: one in McCook, two in North Platte, and four community campuses in Broken Bow, Imperial, Ogallala and Valentine. The college was established by the Nebraska Legislature in 1973. It was created by a merger of McCook Junior College, North Platte Junior College, and Mid-Plains Vocational Technical School in North Platte. McCook Junior College, founded in 1926, was the oldest two-year institution in Nebraska the time of the merger.

Athletics
Mid-Plains's campuses that sponsor athletics operate separate athletic programs, and neither plays games under the "Mid-Plains" name; the McCook campus plays as the McCook CC Indians, while the North Platte campuses complete as the North Platte CC Knights. Both are members of the Nebraska Community College Athletic Conference of the NJCAA.

References

External links
 Official website

Two-year colleges in the United States
Community colleges in Nebraska
1973 establishments in Nebraska